The II Air Support Command is an inactive United States Air Force unit.  It was last assigned to Third Air Force at Biggs Field, Texas, as the II Tactical Air Division, where it was inactivated on 22 December 1945.

The command was organized in September 1941 as the 2nd Air Support Command to control the tactical units of 2d Air Force.

History
General Headquarters Air Force reorganized its four regional air districts as Numbered Air Forces in the spring of 1941.  By the fall of that year, each of these had organized as a support command and three combat commands.  

In the summer of 1941 GHQ AF had decided to establish commands to direct its air support mission in each numbered air force, plus one additional command reporting directly to GHQ AF.  These commands would be manned from inactivating wings, and would initially control only observation squadrons, which would be transferred from the control of the corps and divisions, although they would remain attached to these ground units.  2nd Air Force organized 2nd Air Support Command at Fort Douglas, Utah in September 1941, soon moving to Will Rogers Field, Oklahoma where it drew cadre and equipment from the 20th Bombardment Wing, which was simultaneously inactivated.  New observation groups were formed, with a cadre drawn from National Guard squadrons that had been mobilized in 1940 and 1941.

However, by early 1942, the command's first commander, Hume Peabody, like two of the other commanders of air support commands had moved overseas, and similar demands led GHQ AF to believe it had little more than the "remnants" of the command remaining.    However, in May, the Army Air Forces (AAF) reaffirmed that each of the continental numbered air forces would have an air support command and the command's manning was brought back up.  

The AAF determined that its continental air forces would specialize in their training operations and air support training would be assigned to Third Air Force.  As a result, in October of 1942, AAF directed that all but one of the observation groups assigned to the command were to be reduced to 50% strength with their personnel used to form new tow target squadrons, or transferred to heavy bomber Operational Training Unit (OTU)s or Replacement Training Unit (RTU)s.   Further, the command, now titled the II Air Support Command, was reassigned to Third Air Force in January 1943.

In August 1943, the command was redesignated the II Tactical Air Division with the intent that the command would engage in combined training with army ground forces.

The unit participated in various air-ground maneuvers, supported ground units in training, and put on air support demonstrations.

Lineage
 Constituted as 2nd Air Support Command on 21 August 1941 
 Activated on 1 September 1941
 Redesignated 2nd Ground Air Support Command c. 30 April 1942
 Redesignated II Air Support Command c. 18 September 1942
 Redesignated II Tactical Air Division on 28 August 1943
 Inactivated on 22 December 1945
 Disbanded on 8 October 1948

Assignments
 Second Air Force, 21 August 1941
 Third Air Force, 25 January 1943
 III Tactical Air Command, 25 October 1945 – 22 December 1945

Components
Groups

 48th Bombardment Group, 1 September 1941 – 2 May 1942
 69th Observation Group (later 69th Reconnaissance Group), 7 September 1942 – 6 August 1943
 71st Observation Group (later 71st Reconnaissance Group), 1 October 1941 – March 1942; August 1942 – c. 7 November 1943
 72d Observation Group, 26 September 1941 – c. 18 January 1942
 75th Observation Group, 12 March 1942 – c. 24 May 1942
 77th Observation Group (later 77th Reconnaissance Group), 12 March – 24 May 1942; 7 September 1942 – 6 August 1943 (attached to III Ground Air Support Command [later, III Air Support Command] until 5 August 1943)
 312th Bombardment Group, 15–16 March 1942
 416th Bombardment Group, attached 1−22 November 1943

Squadrons

 1st Observation Squadron (later 1st Reconnaissance Squadron), 1–26 Sep 1941; 24 May – 24 June 1944
 2d Communications Squadron, Air Support: 1–31 May 1942
 2d Composite Squadron, 8 November 1943 – 18 April 1944
 3rd Observation Squadron, attached 12 August – 23 September 1942
 5th Liaison Squadron, 12 October 1943 – 28 March 1944
 6th Photographic Squadron, 29 March – 7 May 1942
 15th Air Support Communications Squadron (later 15th Tactical Air Communications Squadron): 23 August 1943 – 20 April 1944
 25th Liaison Squadron, 11 August – 19 November 1943 (attached to 71st Tactical Reconnaissance Group after 15 August 1943)
 30th Army Reconnaissance Squadron (later 30th Observation Squadron), 1 September 1941 – 12 March 1942
 37th Photographic Reconnaissance Squadron, 29 March – 12 Apr 1944
 47th Liaison Squadron, 11 August 1943 – 4 April 1944
 72d Liaison Squadron, 11 August 1943 – c. 14 June 1944
 102d Observation Squadron, 1 September – 1 October 1941
 108th Observation Squadron, 1–26 September 1941
 110th Observation Squadron, 1 September – 1 October 1941
 112th Observation Squadron, 1 September – 1 October 1941
 115th Liaison Squadron, 11 August 1943 – 18 April 1944
 124th Observation Squadron, 15–26 September 1941
 125th Liaison Squadron, 11 August – c. 11 October 1943
 128th Observation Squadron, 15 September – 1 October 1941
 157th Liaison Squadron, 10 February – 18 April 1944
 159th Liaison Squadron, 1 March – 18 April 1944
 160th Liaison Squadron, 1–18 April 1944
 162nd Liaison Squadron, 24 June 1944 – 1 September 1945
 398th Fighter Squadron, 10 August – 1 September 1945

Stations

 Fort Douglas, Utah, 1 September 1941
 Will Rogers Field, Oklahoma, c. October 1941
 Birmingham Municipal Airport, Alabama, c. 1 April 1942
 Geiger Field, Washington, 26 May 1942
 Reno Army Air Base, Nevada, 27 May 1942
 Colorado Springs Army Air Base, Colorado, July 1942

 Barksdale Field, Louisiana, 15 March 1943
 DeRidder Army Air Base, Louisiana, c. 31 March 1944
 Stuttgart Army Air Field, Arkansas, February 1945
 Barksdale Field, Louisiana, c. 12 November 1945
 Biggs Field, Texas, c. 23 November-22 December 1945

References

Notes
 Explanatory notes

 Citations

Bibliography

 
  
 
 
 

02